

Early life and education 
Das was born in Puri, Odisha. He received his BS (with honors) in 1972 and MS in 1974 in physics from the University of Delhi. He did his graduate studies in supersymmetry and supergravity at the State University of New York at Stony Brook. He received his Ph.D in Spin 3/2 Fields and Supergravity Theories in 1977.

Career 
He was a research associate at the City College of New York, the University of Maryland and Rutgers University before joining the University of Rochester in 1982. He was promoted to professor in 1993 and is still working there today. He is also an adjunct professor of physics at the Saha Institute of Nuclear Physics in India.

Das' research is in the area of theoretical high energy physics. He works on supersymmetry and supergravity. In recent years, he has worked extensively on non-linear integrable systems, which are systems that, in spite of their complicated appearance, can be exactly solved. He has also been working on finite temperature field theories, generalization of the Standard Model to incorporate CP violation, and problems in quantum field theory and string theory.

In 2006, he was awarded a Fulbright scholarship to teach physics in Brazil.

He has written books and monographs on various disciplines of theoretical physics at the advanced undergraduate and graduate level, like  A Path Integral Approach (World Scientific publishers), Finite Temperature Field Theory (World Scientific publishers), Integrable Models (World Scientific Lecture Notes in Physics), Lectures on Gravitation (World Scientific publishers), and Lectures on Electromagnetism.

In 2002, Das was made a fellow of the American Physical Society "for contributions in the areas of supergravity, integrable models, and finite temperature field theory."

References

External links 
personal home page
Institute Home Page of Dr. Ashok Das
papers from arXiv

Delhi University alumni
Indian emigrants to the United States
Indian nuclear physicists
Living people
1953 births
21st-century American physicists
People from Puri
Academic staff of the University of Calcutta
Indian theoretical physicists
American academics of Indian descent
Scientists from Odisha
20th-century Indian physicists
Fellows of the American Physical Society
Indian scholars
Fulbright alumni